Białka  is a village in the administrative district of Gmina Krasnystaw, within Krasnystaw County, Lublin Voivodeship, in eastern Poland.

Stallion Depo has around 100 Malapolski stallions and 120 Arabians.

References

Villages in Krasnystaw County